Huelves is a municipality in Cuenca, Castile-La Mancha, Spain. It has a population of 58 (INE 2018).

References

External links

Municipalities in the Province of Cuenca